= Yellow copper =

Yellow copper is a colloquial name for various minerals and alloys with high copper content:

- Chalcopyrite
- Brass
